Events from the year 1865 in Germany.

Incumbents
 King of Bavaria – Ludwig II of Bavaria
 Hamburg – Friedrich Sieveking, First Burgomaster of Hamburg (1861–1862; 1865; and again 1868)
Kingdom of Hanover – George (1851–1866)
Kingdom of Prussia –
Monarch – Wilhelm I (1861–1888)
Minister President - Otto von Bismarck (1862–1873)
Kingdom of Saxony – Johann (1854–1873)
Kingdom of Württemberg – Karl (1864–1891)

Events 
 February 8 & March 8 – Gregor Mendel reads his paper on Experiments on Plant Hybridization at two meetings of the Natural History Society of Brünn in Moravia, subsequently taken to be the origin of the theory of Mendelian inheritance.
April 6 – German chemicals producer Badische Anilin- und Sodafabrik (BASF) is founded in Mannheim.
 April 21 – German Chemicals producer BASF moves its headquarters and factories from Mannheim , to the Hemshof District of Ludwigshafen
The General German Cigar Workers Society ("Allgemeiner Deutsche Cigarrenarbeiter-Verein"), established in Leipzig in 1865, was the first centrally organized union in Germany.

Births 
 January 22 – Friedrich Paschen (died 1947), German physicist
 February 17 – Ernst Troeltsch , German theologian (d. 1923 )
 March 30 – Heinrich Rubens , German physicist (d. 1922 )
 April 9
 Erich Ludendorff , German general (d. 1937 )
 Charles Proteus Steinmetz , German-American engineer, electrician (d. 1923 )
 June 19 – Alfred Hugenberg , German businessman, politician (d. 1951 )
 June 21 – Otto Frank (physiologist) , German doctor (d. 1944 )

 July 26 – Philipp Scheidemann, Chancellor of Germany (d. 1939)
 December 8 – Rüdiger von der Goltz , German general (d. 1946 )
 December 23 – Albrecht, Duke of Württemberg , German field marshal (d. 1939 )
Gustav Müller - German murderer and self-confessed serial killer

Deaths 
 August 26 – Johann Franz Encke (born 1791), German astronomer
August 29 – Robert Remak, German embryologist, physiologist and neurologist  (b. 1815)

References 

 
Years of the 19th century in Germany
Germany
Germany